The 1906 Nevada gubernatorial election was held on November 6, 1906. Incumbent Silver John Sparks defeated Republican nominee Jason F. Mitchell with 58.54% of the vote.

General election

Candidates
Major party candidates
John Sparks, Silver
Jason F. Mitchell, Republican

Other candidates
Thomas B. Casey, Socialist

Results

References

1906
Nevada
Gubernatorial